Michael Ryan is a British actor.

Filmography

References

External links

Living people
British male film actors
British male television actors
Place of birth missing (living people)
Year of birth missing (living people)